Candy Store is the ninth studio album by Dutch saxophonist Candy Dulfer. The album was released in 2007 by Heads Up and was produced by Dulfer and Dave Love.

Candy Store reached No. 2 on the Billboard magazine Top Contemporary Jazz chart. The song "L.A. Citylights" reached No. 1 in Smooth Jazz National Airplay charts in the United States. At AllMusic, Jonathan Widran called the album "one of contemporary jazz's finest and funkiest releases of 2007."

Track listing
"Candy" (Chance Howard) – 4:11
"L.A. Citylights" (Bank, Dulfer, Howard) – 3:45
"Music = Love" (Bank, Bed, Dulfer) – 3:54
"La Cabana" (Bank, Dulfer) – 3:03
"11:58" (Bank, Bed, Dulfer) – 4:02
"Summertime" (Bank, Bed, Dulfer) – 4:28
"Soulsax" (Bank, Bed, Dulfer) – 4:24
"Smokin' Gun" (Bed) – 4:51
"Back to Juan" (Bank, Bed, Dulfer, Howard) – 4:27
"If I Ruled the World" (Bank, Bed, Dulfer) – 4:43
"Everytime" (Bank, Bed, Dulfer) – 4:32

Bonus track on US release
 12. "Finsbury Park, Cafe 67 (2007 Version)" (Bank, Dulfer, Gert Jan Mulder) – 4:03

Bonus tracks on Europe release
 13. "My Philosophy" – 3:54"
 14. "Bum Bum" – 3:52"

Personnel
 Candy Dulfer – saxophone, keyboards, vocals
 Louk Boudesteijn – trombone
 Jan van Duikeren – trumpet
 Thomas Bank – keyboards
 Ulco Bed – bass guitar, guitar
 Manuel Hugas – bass guitar
 John Blackwell – drums
 Kasper van Kooten – drums
 Chance Howard – background vocals
 Trijntje Oosterhuis – background vocals

References

2007 albums
Candy Dulfer albums
Heads Up International albums